St Maria Goretti's International Schools is an independent, coeducational school in Port Harcourt, Rivers State, Nigeria, serving children ages 18 months through 17 years. The school commenced operations in 2004 and offers nursery, primary and secondary education. The school is known for bringing out the genius in every child. The school has produced students who performed excellently in both local and international exams such as WASSCE or IGCSE.

Curriculum
In addition to having the Nigerian Standard syllabus, the school's curriculum also incorporates the British National Curriculum. Subjects taught include, English language and literature, mathematics, science, geography, history, information and communications technology (ICT), social studies, French and Portuguese.

See also

 Education in Nigeria
 List of schools in Nigeria

External links

2004 establishments in Nigeria
2000s establishments in Rivers State
Educational institutions established in 2004
Primary schools in Rivers State
Private schools in Rivers State
Schools in Port Harcourt
Secondary schools in Rivers State